Kallymeniaceae is a red algae family in the order Gigartinales.

Genera 
The following genera are accepted within Kallymeniaceae:

 Austrokallymenia 
 Austrophyllis 
 Austropugetia 
 Beringia 
 Blastophyllis 
 Callocolax 
 Callophyllis 
 Cirrulicarpus 
 Crossocarpus 
 Ectophora 
 Erythrophyllum 
 Euthora 
 Glaphyrymenia 
 Glaphyrymeniopsis 
 Hommersandia 
 Hormophora 
 Huonia 
 Ionia 
 Judithia 
 Kallymenia 
 Kallymeniopsis 
 Leiomenia 
 Leniea 
 Meredithia 
 Metacallophyllis 
 Nothokallymenia 
 Nereoginkgo 
 Polycoelia 
 Psaromenia 
 Pugetia 
 Rhipidomenia 
 Rhizopogonia 
 Rhytimenia 
 Salishia 
 Stauromenia 
 Thalassiodianthus 
 Thamnophyllis 
 Tytthomenia 
 Varimenia 
 Velatocarpus 
 Verlaquea 
 Wendya 
 Zuccarelloa

References

External links 

 
Red algae families